Ameen Khan is an Indian politician currently serving as an MLA from Sheo (Rajasthan Assembly constituency). He is a former cabinet minister in the Government of Rajasthan. He is a national level leader of the Indian National Congress.

References

Indian National Congress politicians from Rajasthan
Living people
Year of birth missing (living people)
Rajasthan MLAs 2018–2023
People from Barmer, Rajasthan